Mongmit District, also known as Momeik District, is a newly created district in northern Shan State, Burma (Myanmar); which was formerly part of Kyaukme District. Its administrative center is the city of Momeik.

Administrative divisions

Notes

Districts of Myanmar
Geography of Shan State